Sevilla Atlético is a Spanish football team based in Seville in the autonomous community of Andalusia. Founded in 1950, it is the reserve team of Sevilla FC. It plays in Segunda Federación, and holds home games at Estadio Jesús Navas, with a 7,500-seat capacity.

Reserve teams in Spain play in the same football pyramid as their senior team rather than a separate league. Reserve teams cannot play in the same division as their senior team, so Sevilla Atlético is not eligible for promotion to La Liga, the division in which Sevilla's first team plays. Reserve teams are also no longer permitted to enter the Copa del Rey.

History
Founded in 1950, Sevilla Atlético quickly reached Tercera División, winning the competition in 1961 and 1962 and also spending the 1962–63 season in Segunda División. After three years in the regional leagues in the early 1970s, the club returned to the third level in 1976.

In 1977 Segunda División B was created as the new third division, and Sevilla B spent time in that and the fourth categories. In 1999 it fell short in the second level promotion play-offs, after finishing the regular season as runner-up – earlier, in 1991, the club changed its name to Sevilla Fútbol Club B. In the following decade, in spite of three consecutive top-three finishes, the team underachieved in the playoffs; in the 2006–07 season, however, after a 1–0 aggregate win against Burgos courtesy of a Lolo goal in the second leg at home, it returned to division two after more than 40 years of absence. In 2006, it was again renamed Sevilla Atlético.

After two seasons in division two, with a ninth place in the first year, in a campaign which also saw manager Manuel Jiménez leave to take the reins of the first team, Sevilla Atlético returned again to the third.
Sevilla Atlético finished their 2015–16 campaign in 3rd place in Group 4 and qualified for the promotion play-offs, they beat Lleida Esportiu in the penalties 5–4 and therefore promoted back to Segunda División after 7 years. So in the 2016-17 season, the club finished 13th among 22 teams, never occupying a relegation spot.  In the 2017-18 season, after losing manager Diego Martínez as well as key players Borja Lasso, Antonio Cotán, and Diego González and with ex-Sevilla player Luis Tevenet as manager, Sevilla Atlético were relegated from the second division, finishing last placed 22nd with 32 points.

Club names
Club Deportivo Puerto (1950–1960) 
Sevilla Atlético Club (1960–1991)
Sevilla Fútbol Club "B" (1991–1992)
Sevilla Fútbol Club, S.A.D. "B" (1992–2006)
Sevilla Atlético (2006–present)

Season to season
As CD Puerto

As Sevilla Atlético Club (Farm team)

 As Sevilla FC's reserve team

5 seasons in Segunda División
1 season in Primera Federación
31 seasons in Segunda División B
1 season in Segunda Federación
27 seasons in Tercera División

Current squad

Reserve team

Out on loan

Current technical staff

Selected former players
Note: this list includes players that have appeared in at least 100 league games and/or have reached international status.

Selected former coaches
 Francisco Antúnez (1968–70)
 Antonio López Habas (1977–78)
 José Ángel Moreno (1988–94)
 Juan Carlos Álvarez (1994–95)
 Julián Rubio (1996–97)
 José Ángel Moreno (1997)
 Juan Carlos Álvarez (1998–99), (1999–00)
 Manuel Ruiz Sosa (2000)
 Manolo Jiménez (2000–07)
 Diego (2009–10)
 Diego Martínez (2014–17)
 Luis Tevenet (2017–18)
 Luci (2018–19)
 Paco Gallardo (2019–21)
 Juan Acejo (2021–present)

References

External links
Official website 
BDFutbol team profile
Futbolme team profile 
La futbolteca team profile 

Sevilla FC
Football clubs in Andalusia
Spanish reserve football teams
Association football clubs established in 1950
1950 establishments in Spain
Segunda División clubs
Primera Federación clubs
Sport in Seville